Staroyuryevsky District  is an administrative and municipal district (raion), one of the twenty-three in Tambov Oblast, Russia. It is located in the northwest of the oblast. The district borders with Sarayevsky District of Ryazan Oblast in the north, Sosnovsky District in the east, Michurinsky District in the south, and with Pervomaysky District in the west. Its administrative center is the rural locality (a selo) of Staroyuryevo. Population: 14,553 (2010 Census);  The population of Staroyuryevo accounts for 42.2% of the district's total population.

References

Notes

Sources

Districts of Tambov Oblast